Poligny is the name of several communes in France:

 Poligny, Aube
 Poligny, Hautes-Alpes
 Poligny, Jura
 Poligny, Seine-et-Marne